Henry John Franklin Jones known as John Jones (6 May 1924 – 28 February 2016) was an English academic, a Fellow of Merton College, Oxford, and Oxford Universitys 38th Professor of Poetry (1978–1983).  Jones wrote books on literary topics including Greek tragedy, Wordsworth, Shakespeare and a novel, The Same God (1972).

The Same God is  described as "idiosyncratic" by literary historian and critic Frank Kermode (1920–2010).

Works
 1954: The Egotistical Sublime: A History of Wordsworth's Imagination
 1962: On Aristotle and Greek Tragedy 
 1962: Heathcote William Garrod 1878-1960
 1963: H. W. Garrod's The Study of Good Letters (as editor)
 1969: John Keats's Dream of Truth
 1972: The Same God (novel)
 1983: Dostoevsky
 1995: Shakespeare at Work
 1999: Fyodor Dostoevsky's Crime and Punishment

References

Fellows of Merton College, Oxford
Oxford Professors of Poetry
Alumni of Merton College, Oxford
People educated at Blundell's School
1924 births
2016 deaths